Claudio Martelli (born 24 September 1943) is an Italian politician. He was the right-hand man of Bettino Craxi, the socialist Prime Minister from 1983–1987.

Biography
Martelli was born at Gessate, in the province of Milan.

He graduated in Philosophy and joined the Italian Socialist Party in 1966. In 1976, he was called by the leader of the party, Bettino Craxi, to continue his career in Rome. He was elected to the Italian Parliament in 1979 and became vice-leader (with Valdo Spini) of the party in 1981. He was also elected for the PSI at the European Parliament in 1984. In 1989, he was nominated as vice-President of the Council and in 1991 became Minister for Justice in both of the governments of Giulio Andreotti (1989–1992).
In 1990, the Italian Immigration law known as the Martelli Law was passed in parliament. 

During Tangentopoli, he ran for the party leadership after the resignation of Bettino Craxi, after Craxi was accused of corruption. However, his candidacy was blown off by his involvement in the 7 million dollar bribe in 1980 and resigned as Minister of Justice.

He exited the political world to deal with his judicial cases. In 1997, after concluding his legal battles, he founded Mondoperaio (former magazine of the PSI). In the same year he was elected to the European Parliament for the Italian Social Democrats. However, in 2000, he left the SDI and joined the Socialist Party – New PSI. He became spokesman for the party but was not elected to the Italian Parliament in 2001 and left the party in 2005. In 2005, for second time, he left the political spectrum and became a presenter of a television political program.

Judicial proceedings 
In the Tangentopoli scandal, regarding the illicit financing of the Socialist Party, Martelli was sentenced to 8 months in prison in 2000, suspended on probation, after confessing, for having received ₤ 500 million in the case of the Enimont maxi-tangent. According to court documents, Roberto Calvi paid bribes to Martelli during the Banco Ambrosiano affair; however in this case he was not convicted. His name was again brought to the attention of the judicial chronicles as part of the State-Mafia Pact trial, when the ex Cosa nostra killer, Francesco Onorato, told of the start of the strategy of the massacres prepared by Totò Riina after the sentence of the trial: "In the list of people to kill, as I learned from Salvatore Biondino, the ambassador of the commission, there were Lima, Andreotti and his son, the former ministers Mannino, Vizzini, but also Martelli. We were the ones who had Martelli elected as minister of Justice: in 1987 we had financed his electoral campaign with ₤ 200 million. And then Martelli kept his promises, because he gave to some members of the mafia the hospital arrests".

References

1943 births
Living people
People from the Province of Milan
Deputy Prime Ministers of Italy
Italian Ministers of Justice
Italian Socialist Party MEPs
MEPs for Italy 1999–2004
MEPs for Italy 1984–1989
MEPs for Italy 1989–1994
New Italian Socialist Party politicians